Aglaia luzoniensis is a species of plant in the family Meliaceae. It is found in Indonesia and the Philippines. It can grow up to 10 meters tall and its bole can be up to 15 centimeters of diameter.

References

luzoniensis
Near threatened plants
Taxonomy articles created by Polbot